is a 2003 Japanese crime TV film directed by Takashi Miike. It was released in other regions under the title The Negotiator or simply Negotiator.

Plot
Three man wearing motorcycle helmets rob a convenience store then abandon their vehicle outside a hospital. A group of people are taken hostage in the hospital and Inspector Ishida and Captain Tohno handle the negotiations. Ishida suggests allowing the three criminals to escape with three doctors as their hostages in order to let the other hostages go free. After this is done, Lt. Ado tries to understand the motive for the crime. He discovers that something else is behind the crime and that the hospital was not selected by chance.

Cast
Hiroshi Mikami as Inspector Ishida
Mayu Tsuruta as Capt. Maiko Tohno
Shirō Sano as Lt. Ando
Kenichi Endō as Convenience store clerk
Masatō Ibu as Ishida's boss
Renji Ishibashi as Counselor Kanemoto
Kumi Nakamura as Mrs. Ishida
Shigemitsu Ogi
Oji Osuga
Ryoko Yonekura
Kenji Takechi as SAT
Yōji Tanaka

External links

References

Films directed by Takashi Miike
Japanese television films
2003 television films
2003 films
2000s crime films
Crime television films
Films about hostage takings
Films about police officers
Films about surrogacy
Films based on Japanese novels
Films set in hospitals
Japanese crime films
Japanese films about revenge
2000s Japanese films
Japanese pregnancy films